Penaeoidea is the larger of the two superfamilies of prawns. It comprises eight families, three of which are known only from fossils. The fossil record of the group stretches back to Aciculopoda, discovered in Famennian sediments in Oklahoma.
† Aciculopodidae (1 genus, 1 species)
† Aegeridae (2 genera, 25 species)
Aristeidae (10 genera, 28 species)
Benthesicymidae (5 genera, 43 species)
† Carpopenaeidae (1 genus, 3 species)
Penaeidae (48 genera, 286 species)
Sicyoniidae (1 genus, 53 species)
Solenoceridae (10 genera, 86 species)

See also

Sergestoidea

References

Dendrobranchiata
Extant Late Devonian first appearances
Taxa named by Constantine Samuel Rafinesque
Arthropod superfamilies